Sirope is the 11th studio album recorded by Spanish singer-songwriter Alejandro Sanz. It was produced by himself alongside Grammy award winner Sebastian Krys. It was released on May 4, 2015. Sirope earned nominations for Album of the Year and won for Best Contemporary Pop Vocal Album at the 16th Latin Grammy Awards. Sirope also received a nomination for Best Latin Pop Album at the 58th Annual Grammy Awards.

Track listing

Production credits 

 Produced by: Alejandro Sanz y Sebastian Krys
 Engineering and mixing: Sebastian Krys and Rafa Sardina
 Additional engineering: Andres Torres, Rouble Kapoor, Brendan Dakora, Andy Ford, David Reyes y Alberto Rodriguez
 Masterizado: Tom Coyne

Charts

Weekly charts

Year-end charts

Certifications

See also
List of number-one albums of 2015 (Spain)
List of number-one Billboard Latin Albums from the 2010s

References

2015 albums
Alejandro Sanz albums
Spanish-language albums
Universal Music Spain albums
Latin Grammy Award for Best Contemporary Pop Vocal Album
Albums produced by Sebastian Krys